John Madigan may refer to:
 John Madigan (politician)
 John Madigan (Gaelic footballer)
 John Madigan (ringmaster)
 John Madigan (rugby union)